Philippe B. Wilson is a Franco-British healthcare scientist who is Professor of One Health at Nottingham Trent University. Since 2021, he has served as Chief Scientific Officer of NHS Willows Health. His research considers the development of tools and technologies for translational medicine with applications to human, environmental and animal health.

Early life and education 
Wilson undertook his secondary education at Churchill Academy and Sixth Form. He was an undergraduate student in chemistry at the University of Bath. He remained at The University of Bath for his doctoral research.

Research and career 
Wilson moved to De Montfort University as an Early Career Academic Fellow in Clinical Chemistry.  He became an associate professor at De Montfort University in 2019. There, he worked on nuclear magnetic resonance technologies in point of care applications.

In 2020, Wilson moved to a position as Scientific Director and Head of Conservation of the Rare Breeds Survival Trust in order to support the growing academic activities of the organisation. Same year, he took up the position of chair and Professor of One Health at Nottingham Trent University within the School of Animal, Rural and Environmental Sciences and the Medical Technologies Innovation Facility.

During the COVID-19 pandemic in 2020, Wilson was appointed as Chief Scientific Officer of NHS Willows Health, a National Health Service Primary Care Network. He led the Clinical Trial Unit and achieved First Global Patient In for AstraZeneca's TACKLE monoclonal antibody clinical trial.

Wilson's research now focusses on One Health. He has studied biosensors, including benchtop nuclear magnetic resonance devices and nitrogen-vacancy centers for quantum sensing. He chairs the Royal Society of Biology East Midlands Branch, and is appointed to the Farm Animal Genetic Resources Committee within the Department for Food, Environment and Rural Affairs in UK Government, and the Committee on the Toxicity of Chemicals in Food, Consumer Products and the Environment at Public Health England and the Food Standards Agency. He is a Fellow of the Royal Society of Biology, and a Fellow of the Linnean Society of London.

Awards and honors
In 2018, he was named by Forbes Magazine in their 30under30 listing for Science and Healthcare
In 2019, Wilson was awarded the Joseph Black Medal from the Royal Society of Chemistry for research-led teaching, and was named in the International Union of Pure and Applied Chemistry's Periodic Table of Younger Chemists as the element Krypton.
 In 2021, he was named by The Analytical Scientist Magazine in their "Power List".

Selected publications 
Self‐Assembled Anion‐Binding Cryptand for the Selective Liquid–Liquid Extraction of Phosphate Anions

Benchtop Low-Frequency 60 MHz NMR Analysis of Urine: A Comparative Metabolomics Investigation

Low-Field, Benchtop NMR Spectroscopy as a Potential Tool for Point-of-Care Diagnostics of Metabolic Conditions: Validation, Protocols and Computational Models

Preliminary demonstration of benchtop NMR metabolic profiling of feline urine: chronic kidney disease as a case study

16 Years of breed management brings substantial improvement in population genetics of the endangered Cleveland Bay Horse

References 

Year of birth missing (living people)
Living people
Alumni of the University of Bath
British scientists
French scientists
Academics of Nottingham Trent University